The Triplets are a pop rock trio that crossed over musical  boundaries from the U.S through Latin America. Composed of the triplets Diana, Sylvia, and Vicky Villegas (all born April 18th, 1965) of an American mother and a Mexican father, the group recorded in both English and Spanish. They first gained recognition after winning the MTV Basement Tapes Contest in 1986 for the song "Boys", and were awarded a contract with Elektra Records and released their first EP "Break The Silence" 

They scored a hit single on the U.S. Billboard Hot 100 chart in 1991 with "You Don't Have to Go Home Tonight" as well as on the Adult Contemporary Chart with "Sunrise". They released a VHS tape in 1991 as well. Subsequent hits followed on the Billboard Latin charts.
On September 9, 2015 the band announced they were reuniting and releasing a new CD entitled "Independence Road." The album was released in September 2016 with Sylvia and Vicky performing and Diana writing songs.

Musical awards and nominations included a Grammy Award nomination for Best Latin Performance (1993), American Music Nomination for best new group, (1991), a New York Music Award for best new group (1991) and the Desy Award for best new Latin group (1991).

Discography

Albums
Break the Silence (Elektra Records, 1986)
Thicker Than Water (Mercury, 1991; Billboard 200 peak #125)
Fuerza del Parentesco (Mercury Records, 1991 - Spanish version of Thicker Than Water)
Algo Mas Que Amor (Capitol/EMI Latin, 1993)
Independence Road (Various Artists Records, September 26, 2016)

Singles

References

External links

Mexican pop music groups
Sibling musical trios
Triplets
Latin pop music groups
Women in Latin music